David Herd Torrance (born 13 March 1961) is a Scottish National Party (SNP) politician.  He has been the Member of the Scottish Parliament (MSP) for the Kirkcaldy constituency since 2011.

Background
Born in Kirkcaldy, David Torrance was educated at Balwearie High School and Adam Smith College, where he gained an HND Mechanical Engineering.

Torrance is a member of the Scout Association, and has been Scout Leader since 1979. He is also the Assistant District Commissioner for Kirkcaldy District Scouts.

Career
Torrance joined the Scottish National Party in 1981 and was a Fife local Councillor in Fife Council from 1995 until being elected as an MSP in 2011.

He worked for British Gas, Alcan Chemicals, and Bosch Rexroth before going into politics full-time in 2007, working for Christopher Harvie MSP.

Electoral history

References

External links 
 

1961 births
Living people
People from Kirkcaldy
People educated at Balwearie High School
Scottish National Party MSPs
Members of the Scottish Parliament 2011–2016
Members of the Scottish Parliament 2016–2021
Members of the Scottish Parliament 2021–2026